Shiretoko ("end of the Land/Earth") may refer to:
 Shiretoko National Park, in Hokkaidō, Japan
 Shiretoko Peninsula, in Hokkaidō, Japan
 Shiretoko, former name of Novikovo in Sakhalin Oblast, Russia; previously administered as a part of Karafuto Prefecture
 Shiretoko-class patrol vessel